The Kirchsee is a lake in Plön district in the north German state of Schleswig-Holstein, in a region known as "Holstein Switzerland".

The Kirchsee is the lake in the town centre of Preetz. The original settlement of Preetz is situated on its western shore. This is also the location of Preetz's town church, after which the lake is named. The Kirchsee is crossed by the River Schwentine, which flows from the south, from the Lanker See. Today the lake is nearly surrounded by built-up areas.

 

LKirchsee
Lakes of Schleswig-Holstein